B K Model High School is a co-educational school located in the Cantonment area in Belagavi, near the Head Post Office of Belagavi, India and is regulated and supervised by Karnataka Secondary Education Examination Board. Near by educational institutions are  St Mary's High School, and  St. Paul's High School.

History

Academic standing

Co curricular activities
B K Model hosted State Science Exhibition, 2015, where students from primary schools and high schools participating, organized by  Department of Science and Technology, New Delhi; Directorate of State Educational Research and Training; Belagavi  Zilla Panchayat; and  Department of Public Instruction. BK Model High School Ground was host of Belgaum  Home Minister, 2018 contest organized by Niyati Foundation, an NGO, where Sonali Kulkarni was a guest.

Sports

Notable alumni
 Malhar Bhatt Joshi, cinematographer in the South Indian film industry.

References

Schools in Belagavi district
Schools in Belgaum
High schools and secondary schools in Karnataka